In Greek mythology, the name Alcimache (Ancient Greek: Ἁλκιμάχη) may refer to:

Alcimache, daughter of Aeacus and the mother of Medon by Oileus. Alternately, Alcimache was a daughter of Phylacus and mother of Ajax the Lesser, and on that account was equated with Eriopis by the author of Naupactica.
Alcimache or Alcimacheia, daughter of Harpalion, a Maenadic follower of Dionysus; she participated in the god's Indian campaign and was killed by Morrheus(Μορρεὺς).
Alcimache, a surname of Athena.

Notes

References 

 Nonnus of Panopolis, Dionysiaca translated by William Henry Denham Rouse (1863-1950), from the Loeb Classical Library, Cambridge, MA, Harvard University Press, 1940.  Online version at the Topos Text Project.
 Nonnus of Panopolis, Dionysiaca. 3 Vols. W.H.D. Rouse. Cambridge, MA., Harvard University Press; London, William Heinemann, Ltd. 1940–1942. Greek text available at the Perseus Digital Library.
Suida, Suda Encyclopedia translated by Ross Scaife, David Whitehead, William Hutton, Catharine Roth, Jennifer Benedict, Gregory Hays, Malcolm Heath Sean M. Redmond, Nicholas Fincher, Patrick Rourke, Elizabeth Vandiver, Raphael Finkel, Frederick Williams, Carl Widstrand, Robert Dyer, Joseph L. Rife, Oliver Phillips and many others. Online version at the Topos Text Project.

Maenads
Companions of Dionysus
Women in Greek mythology
Aeginetan characters in Greek mythology
Thessalian characters in Greek mythology
Thessalian mythology
Epithets of Athena
Locrian mythology